A Sentimental Capitalism is a Canadian comedy-drama film, directed by Olivier Asselin and released in 2008. The film stars Lucille Fluet as Fernande Bouvier, an aspiring artist in Paris in the 1920s who unwittingly becomes the cause of the Wall Street Crash of 1929 after businessman Victor Feldman (Alex Bisping) bets two of his colleagues that he can sell her on the financial market despite her lack of tangible artistic output.

The film's cast also includes Paul Ahmarani, Frank Fontaine, Sylvie Moreau, Anne Létourneau, Harry Standjofski and Steve Barry.

The film premiered on October 8, 2008 as the opening film of the Festival du nouveau cinéma. It was regarded by some critics as prophetic, as the financial crisis of 2007–2008 was in full swing by the time of its release.

Isabelle Malenfant received a Jutra Award nomination for Best Editing at the 11th Jutra Awards in 2009.

References

External links

2008 films
2008 comedy-drama films
Canadian comedy-drama films
French-language Canadian films
Films directed by Olivier Asselin
2000s Canadian films